Vera Hamenoo-Kpeda (born 23 June 1992), better known by her stage name MzVee, is a Ghanaian singer, afropop, dancehall and R&B artiste. Her debut solo album features several hit singles including 'Borkor Borkor' (meaning - Slowly), 'Natural Girl' and 'Dancehall Queen'. MzVee was signed to the record label Lynx Entertainment and was the winner of the New Artiste of the Year award at the 2015 Ghana Music Awards. She parted ways with Lynx Entertainment in the year 2019. She is currently a solo artist.

Early life 

MzVee was born in South La Estates, Accra to Ernest Hamenoo-Kpeda, a businessman, and Florence Hamenoo-Kpeda, a caterer. She has two older sisters and a brother and attended St Martin de Porres School in Accra in her early years . She moved on to St. Mary's Girls' Senior High School and is now studying Business Administration at Ghana Telecom University.

Music career

2012 – 2013: Early beginnings 
MzVee first burst onto the Ghanaian music scene in the summer of 2012 as the lead singer of Lynx Entertainment's girl band D3.  The band had popular hits like "Good Girls Gone Bad" and "Gyani Gyani" before disbanding at the end of 2013 due to the young members' educational commitments. .

2014 – 2016: Breakthrough 
MzVee launched her solo career with debut single ‘Borkor Borkor’ released in January 2014. She followed this with hit single ‘Natural Girl’ and went on to win the 'Unsung Artiste Award' at the 2014 Ghana Music Awards. Her debut album was released in November 2014 and features collaborations with several award-winning artistes such as Stonebwoy, VIP, Shatta Wale, Richie Mensah, M.anifest and Didier Awadi.

Following the success of her award-winning debut album, MzVee released her second album titled Verified in November 2015 to rave reviews. The album has earned MzVee 7 nominations at the 2016 Ghana Music Awards including 'Album of the Year' and 'Record of the Year' for the single 'Abofra' which features Efya. Her highly anticipated third album DaaVee was released in May 2017.

2017– 2019: Hiatus 
MzVee took a two-year break from the Music Industry from 2017 to 2019. In an interview with TV3 on Monday, January 5, 2020, she revealed that her reason for leaving the music industry was a massive depression which she was going through. This has dismissed pregnancy rumors that some people were saying is the reason for her absence from the Music Industry. Throughout the two-year period MzVee found help from her friend Efya who kept supporting and encouraging her until she overcame depression. She has announced that as of 2020 she is back to music and will be releasing a single she has titled "Sheriff".

2020 – 2021: inVeencible 
One other thing MzVee said when she returned from her depression-induced hiatus from music was that she will be releasing two albums. However, she obviously could not release the two albums as she promised due to the COVID-19 pandemic.

She rather managed to release one album dubbed inVeencible.  The album which featured Sarkodie, Mugeez, Efya, Medikal, Kelvyn Boy, Kojo Funds, as well as Falz and Navy Kenzoo, was released on December 11, 2020. In March 2021, she partnered with Trace TV to release her music video for her song 'You Alone'.

2022: 10 Thirty 
On 24 June 2022, MzVee released her fifth album, titled 10 Thirty inspired by her 10th year as a musician and to celebrate turning 30 years. 10 Thirty, a ten–tracked album featured Nigerian musicians, Bella Shmurda, Yemi Alade,Tiwa Savage and Ghanaian musicians Stonebwoy and Kofi Kinaata.

Musical style and recognition 

MzVee's music contains elements of afropop, R&B and dancehall and her strong vocal abilities earned her a nomination for 'Female Vocalist of the Year' at the 2015 Ghana Music Awards and the award for 'Most Promising Act' at the 2015 Ghana Music Honors. She is regarded as one of the stars of Ghana's dancehall scene and received the award for 'Best Female Vocalist of the Year'  at the 2015 Ghanaian dancehall awards, BASS awards. Her trademark natural African hair and hit single ‘Natural Girl’ has made her an inspiration to young girls across Africa who want to celebrate their natural look.

MzVee's impressive rise to the top continued with a nomination in June 2015 in the 'Best International New Artist' category at the BET Awards 2015. This brand new fan-voted category celebrates rising stars from across the channel's international footprint.

In October 2015, MzVee was appointed the World Bank Ambassador for their 'End Extreme Poverty Campaign'. She released the official campaign song titled 'End Poverty' and became a World Bank #Music4Dev Guest Artist; a role which has been held in the past by a number of award-winning artists including D'Banj and Fally Ipupa.

MzVee was named in MTV Base's list of the top African artists to watch out for in 2016. This list featured the breakthrough hit makers of 2015 on the African continent. She has also been nominated in the ‘Best Urban Artist’ category at the 2016 KORA Music Awards and received 7 nominations at the 2016 Ghana Music Awards including Songwriter of the Year with Richie Mensah and Efya, Album of the Year and Best Female Vocalist.

On May 20, 2016, MzVee was nominated for the BET Awards 2016 - Best International Act: Africa category and became the first Ghanaian female musician to be nominated for a major BET Award. She was also nominated in the Best Female category in October 2016 for the MTV Africa Music Awards.

MzVee continues to receive both critical and commercial acclaim for her work and was awarded the Best Female Artist Honour at the Ghana Music Honours on 4 March 2017. She was also nominated for Reggae/Dancehall Artiste of the Year, Best Female Vocalist and Overall Artiste of the Year at the 2017 Ghana Music Awards.

Discography 
Re-Vee-Lation (2014)
Verified (2015)
DaaVee (2017)
InVeecible (2020)
10 Thirty (2022)

Awards and nominations

References

External links 
 
 Lynx Entertainment
 inVeencible Album

Ghanaian musicians
1992 births
Living people
St Mary's Senior High School (Ghana) alumni